Rosenberg Shoes is one of Australia's oldest surviving family specialty footwear stores located in the inner south-eastern suburb of Windsor in the city of Melbourne. Founded by David Rosenberg in 1903, the store catered to providing footwear for individuals who required tailored fittings, crafting a speciality in large, small and wider fittings. Presently, the store sells only larger sizes and operates an online store and physical location.

History

David Rosenberg arrived in Australia was at a time of growing confidence and prosperity, only two years after Federation of the Australian colonies. David, one of five brothers emigrated from Ghetomah, Russia with the intention of relocating to and starting his new life in New Zealand. After his long journey by sea, David's second port of call after South Africa was to the city of Melbourne, Australia.

This was where he met and fell in love with his soon to be wife Matilda. All plans to continue on his travels to New Zealand were soon forgotten. With his new wife Matilda and content with his newfound home, David set about creating his business that has become his legacy lasting for more than a century. Due to difficulties of that time and the tyranny of distance, with his brothers dispersed each travelling to numerous continents, all historical records and communications were lost.

Survived by his ancestors, the store has been passed from generation to generation. David Rosenberg Sr. was succeeded by Marcus Rosenberg, then passed to David Rosenberg, and now Stuart Rosenberg. The store has survived the passage of time, world war, and even historical criminal encounters with notorious underworld figures such as Joseph Theodore Leslie more commonly known as Squizzy Taylor who in the early 1900s robbed the store then tried selling the stolen booty back to David.

In 2012, as part of a long delayed review of the Chapel Street heritage precinct, the City of Stonnington categorised the building as grade 'A2', and noted that the shopfront had special significance. It is described as "Shopfront - Intact elements: Metal frame with frosted highlights, marble stallboard, double glazed timber doors, recessed entry with octagonal glassed leadlight showcase."

The store's beautiful shopfront still remains intact and provides a reminder to onlookers of a bygone era.

References

External links

Yeezy Replica Sneakers

Australian fashion
Shoe companies of Australia
Australian companies established in 1903
Retail companies established in 1903
Retail companies of Australia
Online retailers of Australia
Companies based in Melbourne